The Arnelo Affair is a 1947 American film noir starring John Hodiak, George Murphy, Frances Gifford, and Dean Stockwell, and co-written and directed by Arch Oboler.

Plot
A lawyer's wife, Anne Parkson (Frances Gifford) is bored and neglected. She begins meeting with one of her husband's clients, nightclub owner Tony Arnelo (John Hodiak), for interior design work.  There develops an awareness between them that an affair is a possibility. One afternoon she arrives at Tony's, and soon after his girlfriend shows up. The girlfriend is upset by Anne being there and starts making a fuss. Tony arrives, hits his girlfriend, and Parkson runs out.  

Police find the girlfriend murdered, Anne's unique compact near the body. Tony planted the compact, in order to blackmail and implicate Anne in the killing.  He is in love with Anne and attempts to force her into leaving her husband. A homicide detective soon figures out the facts and confronts Tony. When Tony is made to realize that his lies and blackmail will destroy innocent Anne's place in society, he escapes the detective's custody in order to commit "suicide by cop".

Cast 
 John Hodiak as Tony Arnelo 
 George Murphy as Ted Parkson 
 Frances Gifford as Anne Parkson 
 Dean Stockwell as Ricky Parkson 
 Eve Arden as Vivian Delwyn 
 Warner Anderson as Detective Sam Leonard 
 Ruth Brady as Dorothy Alison 
 Lowell Gilmore as Dr. Avery Border 
 Archie Twitchell as Roger Alison  
 Ruby Dandridge as Maybelle, the Maid 
 Joan Woodbury as Claire Lorrison

Reception
The film earned $524,000 in the US and Canada and $314,000 elsewhere. Although MGM records do not state whether the film was profitable, the cost of $892,000 makes it likely it incurred a loss.

Critical response
Contemporary New York Times film critic Bosley Crowther panned the film.  He wrote, "And childish it is, beyond question, despite the promising' presence in the cast of John Hodiak, Frances Gifford, George Murphy and other minor 'names.' It's a 'stream of consciousness' fable about a lawyer's neglected wife who takes up with a night-club owner and gets into a most embarrassing jam. It is unmercifully slow and sombre and utterly devoid of surprise."

Variety magazine's review at the time was more positive.  The staff wrote, "Arch Oboler, radio’s master of suspense, has effectively transposed his technique into the visual medium with The Arnelo Affair. Strictly speaking this is not a whodunit, nor can it be catalogued as a psychological suspense picture ... There’s never a question as to who committed the murder, but the crime is secondary to its effect on the characters involved. Until the film’s very climax, no hint is given to the ultimate denouement. Dialogue instills the feeling of action where none exists for much of the footage, and the gab is excellent but for a couple of spots when Oboler gives vent to florid passages."

References

External links
 
 
 
 

1947 films
1947 crime drama films
Adultery in films
American crime drama films
American romantic drama films
American black-and-white films
Film noir
Films directed by Arch Oboler
Metro-Goldwyn-Mayer films
1947 romantic drama films
1940s English-language films
1940s American films